Solidago uliginosa, or bog goldenrod, is a North American species of flowering plants in the family Asteraceae. It is found in eastern Canada (from Nunavut to Newfoundland and Manitoba) and the eastern United States (Great Lakes, Northeast, and Appalachian Mountains as far south as northeastern Georgia. There are historical reports of the species growing in Alabama, but these populations appear now to have been extirpated).

Solidago uliginosa is a perennial herb up to 200 cm (80 inches or 6 2/3 feet) tall, spreading by means of underground rhizomes. One plant can produce as many as 230 small yellow flower heads in a narrow, elongate array. The species grows in bogs, marshes, and swamps.

References

External links
 
 
Ontario Wildflowers
Lady Bird Johnson Wildflower Center
Flore laurentienne Frère Marie-Victorin (1885-1944),  Illustre et raconte le Québec, les Québécois, l'immensité du pays, ses lumières, ses humeurs, Solidago uliginosa in French, with photos and line drawing

uliginosa
Plants described in 1834
Flora of Canada
Flora of the Eastern United States